Richard K. Croy (born July 19, 1977) is an American college basketball coach who is the current head coach of the California Baptist Lancers men's basketball team. Croy has been a basketball coach since 1999 and has held his current position at California Baptist since 2013.

Croy grew up in Walnut Creek, California and played college basketball at San Francisco State. He began his basketball coaching career as an assistant at UC Riverside and Concordia University Irvine. His first head coaching position was at the junior college level at Citrus College from 2005 to 2010. Under Croy, Citrus won 130 games, three conference titles, and a California state championship.

At California Baptist, Croy led the Lancers to five straight NCAA Division II Tournament appearances from 2014 to 2018 and two Pacific West Conference titles. In 2018, California Baptist moved to Division I as a member of the Western Athletic Conference; Croy led California Baptist to an appearance in the 2019 College Basketball Invitational, and California Baptist had winning records in its first three Division I seasons.

Playing career
Croy attended Northgate High School in Walnut Creek, California where he was a part of the 1995 CIF State Championship team. In college, Croy holds the school record for three-point field goals, is second all-time in games played, and eighth all-time in scoring at San Francisco State where he graduated in 1999.

Coaching career
After graduation, Croy began his coaching career in 1999 as an assistant coach at UC Riverside for two seasons before moving on to Concordia for another season. He made his return as an assistant coach with the Highlanders, where he stayed from 2002 to 2005 before accepting the head coaching position at CCCAA institution Citrus College. While at Citrus, he led the Owls to three-straight Western State Conference South titles, the 2008 California State Championship and the 2010 California Community College Athletic Association Final Four. He was also named a three-time WSC Coach of the Year. During this five years at Citrus, Croy compiled a 130–35 record, which is second all-time in school history for total wins, and first all-time in winning percentage.

In 2010, Croy joined Randy Bennett's staff at St. Mary's, where he stayed until 2013 before becoming the 12th head men's basketball coach in California Baptist history on April 2, 2013. Since joining the Lancers, Croy guided the team to the NCAA Division II men's basketball tournament every season before its transition to NCAA Division I and the Western Athletic Conference for the 2018–19 season.

Head coaching record

Junior college

College

References

Living people
1977 births
American men's basketball coaches
Basketball coaches from California
California Baptist Lancers men's basketball coaches
Citrus Owls men's basketball coaches
College men's basketball head coaches in the United States
Saint Mary's Gaels men's basketball coaches
San Francisco State Gators men's basketball players
Sportspeople from Walnut Creek, California
UC Riverside Highlanders men's basketball coaches
American men's basketball players